

History
The history of the College of Agriculture and Natural Resources at The University of Maryland is simply the history of the University itself. The University of Maryland was chartered in 1856 as the Maryland Agricultural College.  Charles Benedict Calvert spent $21,000 to purchase 420 acres in College Park, Maryland, and later that year founded the college. The school opened on October 5, 1859 with a total of 34 students. In 1864, the state legislature designated it as  a land grant college under the Morrill Act of 1862, which made federal funds available.  
By the end of the Civil War, the University, having been hit hard by financial problems and a decline in student enrollment, found itself bankrupt. The state legislature assumed half ownership of the school in 1866, which pulled the college out of bankruptcy, and made the college, in part, a state institution. Enrollment slowly increased at the University, and over the next 26 years Maryland gained a reputation as a strong research institution. The federally funded Agricultural Experiment Station was established under the Hatch Act of 1887, and new state laws granted the college regulatory control over several areas of agriculture and public safety. The school has grown over the years, adding several other academic departments. However, it still remains a land grant university, and continues to have a strong college of agriculture and natural resources.

Departments and options
Agricultural and Resource Economics
 Agricultural and Resource Economics
 Business Management
 Environmental and Resource Policy
 Food Production
 International Agriculture
 Political Process

Animal and Avian Sciences
 Animal and Avian Sciences
 Animal Care and Management
 Equine Studies
 Laboratory Animal Management
 Pre-Veterinary medicine
 Sciences/Pre-Professional
 Animal Biotechnology

Plant Science and Landscape Architecture
 Plant Science
 Horticulture and Crop Production
 Landscape Management
 Plant Science
 Turf and Golf Course Management
 Urban Forestry
 Landscape Architecture
 Agricultural Science and Technology
 Agricultural Science Education

Nutrition and Food Science
 Nutrition and Food Science
 Dietetics
 Food Science
 Nutritional Science

Environmental Science and Technology
 Environmental Science and Technology
 Ecological Technology and Design
 Environmental Health
 Soil and Watershed Science
 Natural Resource Management

Environmental Science and Policy
 Environmental Science and Policy
 Environment and Agriculture
 Environmental Economics
 Environmental Restoration and Management
 Soil, Water, and Land Resources
 Wildlife Ecology and Management

Institute of Applied Agriculture
 A 2-year certificate
 Management programs in: Golf Course, Turfgrass, Agribusiness (Concentrations in Equine and Sustainable Agriculture), Equine, Landscape, Ornamental Horticulture, Golf Course Construction, Sports Turf Management.

Virginia-Maryland Regional College of Veterinary Medicine

Professional education programs
 Institute of Applied Agriculture (IAA)
 Virginia-Maryland Regional College of Veterinary Medicine (VMRCVM), College Park, MD
 Virginia-Maryland Regional College of Veterinary Medicine (VMRCVM), Blacksburg, VA

Rankings
 Among ‘top 15’ green colleges- Grist Magazine
 Agriculture and Resource Economics is the #1 program in Resource and Environmental Economics and #3 in Agricultural Economics.
 The Department of Agriculture and Resource Economics is ranked #3 worldwide among academic Agricultural Economics Departments by Research Papers In Economics (RePEc).

More Information

Student organizations
Agriculture and Natural Resources Student Council

The Agriculture and Natural Resources Student Council is a group of student representatives from each club in the college.  They are responsible for coordinating the Fall Bash, Ag Day, and the AGNR Banquet.  All students welcome to participate.

College of Agriculture and Natural Resources Student Ambassadors

As an ambassador students promote the growth, development, and image of the College of Agriculture and Natural Resources.  They serve as communication links between students, faculty, and the administration.  Provide support and carry out selected activities of the College.  They are also public role models for the College of Agriculture and Natural Resources.  Over 20 students are invited to represent the college, based on their academic achievement and leadership potential.

Alpha Gamma Rho

Alpha Gamma Rho is a social/professional fraternity open to all men from the College of Agriculture and Natural Resources, the College of Chemical and Life Sciences, and men with agricultural backgrounds.

The Fraternity of Alpha Zeta, Maryland Chapter

Alpha Zeta is a professional fraternity made up of both men and women pursuing educational and/or career fields in agriculture.  It is the oldest agriculture fraternity, founded in 1897.

University of Maryland Animal Husbandry Club

The Animal Husbandry Club helps to develop future leaders, build strong interpersonal relationships, and promote the industry of animal agriculture.  The group holds field trips to sheep, swine, dairy, beef, and horse farms.  They also participate in the sponsorship of the livestock show on Ag Day.

Equestrian Club

The Equestrian Club is open to undergraduate, and graduate students, as well as faculty, and staff.   Club members participate in riding and training of the on campus horses, along with their daily care.

Food and Nutrition Club

FAN Club is designed to unite and support the students of  the Department of Nutrition and Food Science.   Members develop leadership skills, while also receiving educational and career opportunities.  The group helps surrounding Maryland communities understand food and nutrition through club programs and activities.

Food Technology Club

The Food and Technology Club is part of the National Institute of Food Technologists Student Association.  The club strives to enhance student's professional development, leadership skills, and provide members with career opportunities.  Some activities include:  Product development, College Bowl, Undergraduate Research Paper Competition, tours of local companies, and guest speakers.

National Resources Management Society

The NRMT society welcomes all students interested in environmental professions.  The group participates in tree planting, stream clean-ups, camping, canoeing, and hosting guest speakers.

Animal and Avian Sciences Graduate Student Association

AASGSA are involved in many activities within the college, to promote graduate student interaction between other students, faculty, and staff.  Events include:  Annual Spaghetti Sizzler, Chili Cookoff, and other social events throughout the year.

Sigma Alpha, Beta Alpha Chapter

Sigma Alpha is a professional sorority, promoting agriculture on a local, state, and national level.  The group emphasized professional development, close friendships, and ties to the surrounding Greek community.

Veterinary Science Club
The Veterinary Science Club is a group of students sharing interest in the field of veterinary science and an official member of the American Pre-Veterinary Medical Association.  The club works to promote a better understanding of the numerous opportunities in veterinary medicine, update students with the latest veterinary school information, and share information on veterinary and animal experiences.

College Park Environmental Group Promoting Environmental Activism and Appreciation
The CPEG is a University of Maryland sponsored student group, promoting environmental awareness.  The group is involved in community service, recreation, and education.

Collegiate 4-H
Collegiate 4-H is an organization that provides its members with a sense of identity on campus, enriches their lives through group projects and recreation, and develops confidence and leadership skills. Mainly the chapter here at the University of Maryland, College Park provides leadership and organization to the College Park Clovers 4-H Club in combination with Prince George's County 4-H, while also engaging in a variety of fundraising efforts. Within our club, there are opportunities to travel including the Northeast Regional Conference held each fall and the National Collegiate Conference held each spring. Collegiate 4-H is open to all students who wish to support youth and the 4-H program. It is not necessary to have prior 4-H experience, only to have an interest in the 4-H ideals and in serving your community.

MANRRS

The group works to promote academic and professional advancement of Minorities in Agriculture and Natural Resources, and related Sciences.  Their main objectives are: to promote programs in agriculture, natural resources, and the related sciences at the University and in the community;  to attract and retain diverse racial and ethnic backgrounds in AGNR programs;  and to provide academic, social, and professional support and networking opportunities for students in the programs of agriculture, natural resources, and related sciences.

More Information

Research
 Maryland Agriculture Experiment Station
 Research Greenhouse Complex
 Center for Agriculture and Natural Resource Policy
 Center for Food, Nutrition, and Agriculture Policy
 Center for Food Safety and Security Systems
 Hughes Center for Agro-ecology
 Northeastern Regional Aquaculture Center
 Joint Institute for Food Safety and Applied Nutrition

More Information

Research and Education Centers
 Central Maryland Research & Education Center
 Lower Eastern Shore Research & Education Center
 Western Maryland Research & Education Center
 Wye Research & Education Center
 University of Maryland, Eastern Shore

More Information

<big>Partnerships with</big>USDAThe University of Maryland's partnership with the United States Department of Agriculture started in 1957, collaborating in such areas as dairy, agronomy, horticulture and agricultural biotechnology research.BARCThe USDA's Henry A. Wallace Beltsville Agricultural Research Center, works with the University of Maryland on agriculture, environmental, and natural resources research.APHISAnimal and Plant Health Inspection Service, also a part of the USDA, host the “Ag Discovery” program with the University of Maryland.  The “Ag Discovery” program is a summer program for high school students, to learn about careers in agriculture.

More Information

Scholarships
The University of Maryland College of Agriculture and Natural Resources boasts a multitude of unique scholarship opportunities for students.  The College is also one of only two colleges at the University to have scholarship support for incoming students.  The depth of scholarships found in the Agriculture and Natural Resources are often made possible due to the tremendous support for Alumni, and donations.

College Scholarships:  44

Outside Scholarships:  56

University of Maryland Scholarships:  12

Travel Scholarships:  4

Study Abroad and International Programs
International Programs in Agriculture and Natural Resources (IPAN)

Started in 1998, and was developed to the encourage research, education and outreach across the globe.  The programs help other countries to improve their crop production, livestock management, and conservation practices.   In return, the University and its students gain valuable knowledge and experience of other countries and cultures abroad.Azerbaijan – Studies revolve around the restoration and renovations of local oil field and solid waste disposal sites.  Lectures will correspond with tours to local cultural and historical destinations as well as a day trip to other cities.China - In cooperation with China's Panda Base, University of Maryland, and Virginia Tech, students traveled to China to intern at the Chengdu panda base.  Students study the reproductive science of the great pandas.  Other visits involve the apple and the dairy goat industry.Georgia – Work in Georgia involves publishing agriculture textbooks, on a range of subjects.  These, include water erosion of soils, agricultural risks, insurance, and forages production and livestock feeding.  Projects also include laboratory modernization; work on the Established Extension Center, and modernizing the veterinary medicine curriculum.India – Students from India have interned with the University of Maryland's college of Veterinary Medicine.  In October 2006 Dean Wei of the College of Agriculture and Natural Resources, along with IPAN officials visited Haryana Agricultural University.  The visit was an effort to create partnerships focusing on faculty and student exchanges in veterinary medicine, plant, biotechnology, and distance education.Russia – Students will take an introductory course to Russian, working side by side with Russian students.  They will also study the economics of collective farming, visit crop and livestock operations.  Learn about the history and culture with a tour of St. Petersburg.Taiwan – In 2009 the Taipei Economic and Cultural Representative Office, in Washington, DC, signed an agreement involving the National Taiwan University and Tunghai University, in Taiwan, and the University of Maryland.  The agreement gave way to ‘co-taught’ classes on Nutrigenomics and Environmental Science.  The class is taught through the College of Agriculture and Natural Resources, and the program is planned to be extended to other subject areas in Agriculture, and to other colleges at the University of Maryland.Turkey – 12 Turkish extension agents were trained in improving their skills in educating farmers.  The goal was for extension agent to learn about the farmer's operation, offer technical assessment, and teach farmers how to solve their own problems during on-farm visits.Uzbekistan and Kazakhstan – Beginning in 2000 AGNR started the multi-year project to help develop an extension service in Uzbekistan.   Helping farmers to work more efficiently and improving challenges to rural economy by developing a more sustainable agriculture.Costa Rica – Students explore Costa Rica's agricultural development and challenges to sustaining its tropical ecosystems.  Students have the chance to visit organic farms.  Courses include lecture as well as activities such as visiting an active volcano, hiking, a trip to hot springs, and beaches.France – Programs include animal crop production and agroecology, viticulture and oenology, landscape management, horticulture, agribusiness and rural tourism.  Students explore French food, culture, and history during their time abroad.  Students spend part of their time in the classroom, learning the language and culture.  They also travel to site visits, field trips, and two weeks of organized sightseeing.Italy – Students study the landscape and the social culture of the country.  Understanding the appreciation Italian culture has for its historical architectural, and the countries efforts to preserve it.Peru - Students spend time in the capital city of Lima, and in the city of Iquitos, a city next to the rainforest.  After morning lectures students set out on excursions to explore the rainforest, and the many practical uses for the plant life that grows there.

University of Maryland Extension
The University of Maryland Extension is a statewide, non-formal education system.  It is an educational program that also provides assistance to citizens who need help with agricultural problems.  The University of Maryland Extension program  helps in the areas of water conservation, pest management programs, dairy farms, food safety, forest industry evaluation, and composting to reduce waste, just to name a few.  It is run by the college of Agriculture and Natural Resources, the VMRCVM, and the University of Maryland Eastern Shore.  Some of their programs include: 4-H youth development; food, nutrition & health; and crops, farm animals and nursery.

AlumniGeorge Demas, B.S., 1980His work for the Natural Resources Conservation Service in Maryland and New Jersey, led to the expansion of the concept of soil, and the revision of the USDA soil taxonomy.Richard R. Arnold, M.S. Marine, Estuarine, & Environmental Sciences, 1992Best known for being selected as a Mission Specialist –Educator by NASA in May 2004.  In March, 2009 he flew aboard the space shuttle mission STS-119Kwesi Ahwoi, Postgraduate Certificate, 1986Current Minister for Food and Agriculture in Ghana.Peter Machado, B.S. 2006, M.S. 2008Machado is a research scientist at the Hershey Tech center in Hershey, PA.  He primarily works with new technologies and emerging product ideas with chocolate in the lab.Fred R. Shank Ph.D.Director of the Center for Food Safety and Applied Nutrition of the FDA for 10 years.  Senior Advisor to the Commissioner for External Academic Affairs in January 1998.  He was the recipient of the Babcock-Hard Award in 1994 and has authored numerous papers and presentations on public health, nutrition and food safety.Lester R. Brown M.S. 1959, LL.D. (Hon.) 1976Founded the Worldwatch Institute in 1974 and the Earth Policy Institute in 2001.  In his lifetime he has authored or co-authored some 50 books, in more than 40 languages.  Brown holds 24 honorary degrees, and is a MacArthur Fellow.  A few of the awards Brown has received are the United Nations Environment Prize in 1987, Japan's Blue Planet Prize and the 2009 Lindbergh Award.Robert F. Chandler Jr.  Ph.D. 1934, D.Sc. (Hon.) 1957In the Philippines, Chandler helped to establish the International Rice Research Institute in 1959. Chandler lead scientist in developing new varieties of rice, tripling the harvests.   He also received the 1988 World Food Prize.Mylo S. Downey B.S. 1927, M.S. 1940Downey was the national director of 4-H, and developer of 4-H-style programs in countries around the world.  He also served as consultant for the Peace Corps and co-founder of the International Farm Youth Exchange.  At Maryland he established the University of Maryland Agricultural Scholarship Fund.Geary Francis “Swede” Eppley B.S. 1920, M.S. 1926After serving in World War I, Eppley finished his undergraduate work and accepted the position of assistant professor of agronomy in 1922.  He later went on the coach Maryland's track team to two national championships.  Eppley held the position of both director and faculty chairman of athletics.  He was the first president of the Atlantic Coast Conference, as well as a co-founder of the conference.  In World War II Eppley received the Legion of Merit.  He retired from Maryland in 1964, after serving as the dean of men and director of student activities.  The Campus Recreation Center is named in his honor.Albin Owings Kuhn B.S. 1938, Ph. D. 1948In 1965 Albin Kuhn served as vice president, and eventually chancellor for both Baltimore City and County University of Maryland campuses.  During this time he constructed new buildings for teaching and research.  Kuhn later became executive vice president of the University System of Maryland in 1979.  He retired in 1982, and that year UMBC named the Albin O. Kuhn Library and Gallery in his honor.William Woolford Skinner B.S. 1895, D.Sc. (Hon.) 1917'''
William Woolford Skinner worked for the U.S. Department of Agriculture for 40 years.  He started his career in 1904, investigating the mineral makeup of underground and surface waters at the Arizona Experiment Station.  Skinner chaired a committee studying the effects of pollution on the Potomac River's and Chesapeake Bay's oyster production in 1910.  From 1923 to 1941 he served on the Board of Regents, and was the chair for seven of those years.

More Information

References

External links
Official University of Maryland College of Agriculture and Natural Resources website.
College of Agriculture records - University of Maryland Libraries
Maryland Agricultural Experiment Station records - University of Maryland Libraries
Mylo S. Downey papers - University of Maryland Libraries. Downey is a notable alumni of the college.

College of Agriculture and Natural Resources
Maryland
Maryland
Agriculture and Natural Resources
Educational institutions established in 1856
1856 establishments in Maryland